Muntahi al-Amal is a book written by Shaykh Abbas Qumi about the Islamic prophet, Muhammad, and his descendants.

References

External links
 Muntaha al-amal at OpenLibrary

 
Shia literature